Bindu Madhav Pathak was an exponent of rudra veena and Sitar. He played Khayal style (Kirana type) of music on been. He was an 'A' grade artist of All India Radio. Some of his famous students are Hindraj Divekar, Shrikant Pathak, Ramchandra V Hegde and Jyoti Hegde. He was a recipient of several awards and titles, including the Karnataka Kala Tilak Award, Sri Kanak Purandhar Prashasti, Arya Bhata Award, and "Vidyaparipoorna" title. Pathak retired as the Head of the Department of Music of Karnatak University. He died at 68 on 4 February 2004.

Early life
Pathak was the son of a veteran rudra veena player Pt. Datto Pant Pathak and hailed from Hubli, Karnataka. He obtained his early training from his father and later from Rajab Ali Khan of Dewas. He became an accomplished artist at a very young age of 17.

Personal life
Pathak died on 4 February 2004. He was survived by his wife, two sons, and a daughter.

Career
Major accomplishments of Pathak include:

Educational qualifications
 M.A.  – Music
 M.A. – English
 M.A. – Hindi
 C.C. –  French
 Ph.D. – Music

Awards
 He was awarded by the Karnataka State Nrutya Academy, Bangalore, with a title "Karnataka Kala Tilak".
 He is also a recipient of the Sri Kanak Purandhar Prashasti, a top most and prestigious award given by the government of Karnataka.
 He has also got the "Arya Bhat Award", with the title "Sangeet Vidya Prapurna".

Publications
 Book – Bharatiya Sangeeta Charitre (Kannada), published by Karnatak University, Dharwad
 Book – Dr. Puttaraj Gawai, published by Sangeet Natya Academy, Bangalore

Research articles and papers
He has published several articles and research papers on music, in English, Hindi and Kannada magazines

Positions held
 Head of the Dept. of Music, in M.M. Arts and Science college, Sirsi (1963–1980)
 Musicologist and Research guide in music and Chairman of Post Graduate school of Music in Karnatak University, Dharwad ( 1981–1995)
 Member – Karnataka State Sangeet Nrutya, Music Syllabus Committee (Kala Academy, Panjim, Goa), Board of Studies in music (Karnatak university), Academic Council (Karnatak university), Indian Music Congress (West Bengal), Indian Musicological Society (Baroda), Director – Regional Centre of Research and Development (Karnataka State Sangeet Natya Academy, Hubli)
 Guide in Music, Dept. of Culture, Ministry of Education and Culture, Government of India, New Delhi
 Guide for Ph.D in the Dept. of Music, Karnatak University, Dharwad

References

Rudra veena players
Hindustani instrumentalists
String musicians
Sitar players
1935 births
2004 deaths
20th-century Indian musicians
People from Hubli
Musicians from Karnataka